Cleiton Mendes dos Santos (born 12 September 1978) is a Brazilian football who* plays as a midfielder for Brazilian Campeonato Pernambucano Série A1 team Santa Cruz FC. He joined Hong Kong First Division League team South China for a short-term loan in 2007 as a strengthening of the squad for Hong Kong FA Cup 2006-07. As he did not meet the deadline of league player registration, he could not represent SCAA for the league matches in the season. He scored his only goal for South China in his debut match against Wofoo Tai Po and South China won 3–0 in this quarter-final match of FA Cup.

Career statistics in Hong Kong
As of 19 May 2007

External links
 Cleiton Mendes dos Santos at HKFA
 Scaafc.com 球員資料 - 5. 基頓 

1978 births
Living people
Brazilian footballers
Association football midfielders
South China AA players
Hong Kong First Division League players
Expatriate footballers in Hong Kong
Brazilian expatriate sportspeople in Hong Kong
Association football forwards
Footballers from Brasília